The 2010 Indy Grand Prix of Sonoma was the sixth running of the Indy Grand Prix of Sonoma and the thirteenth round of the 2010 IndyCar Series season. It took place on Sunday, August 22, 2010. The race contested over 75 laps at the  Infineon Raceway in Sonoma, California.

Classification

Qualifying

Race

References

Indy Grand Prix of Sonoma
Indy Grand Prix of Sonoma
Indy Grand Prix of Sonoma
Indy Grand Prix of Sonoma